Andrés Bullentini (born February 6, 1969, in Rosario, Argentina) is a former Argentine footballer who played as a forward for clubs of Argentina and Chile.

Teams
 Renato Cesarini 1992–1993
 Gimnasia y Esgrima de Jujuy 1993–1996
 Provincial Osorno 1996–1999
 Argentino de Rosario 2000–2005

References
 
 Profile at En una Baldosa 
 Profile at Futbol XXI

1969 births
Living people
Argentine footballers
Association football forwards
Gimnasia y Esgrima de Jujuy footballers
Provincial Osorno footballers
Argentino de Rosario footballers
Chilean Primera División players
Argentine Primera División players
Argentine expatriate footballers
Argentine expatriate sportspeople in Chile
Expatriate footballers in Chile
Footballers from Rosario, Santa Fe